Teofil may refer to:

Teofil Żebrawski (1800–1887), Polish mathematician, bibliographer, architect, biologist, archeologist, cartographer and geodesist
Teofil Adamecki (1886–1969), Polish lawyer and activist
Teofil Kwiatkowski (1809–1891), Polish painter
Teofil Matecki (1810–1886), Polish physician, social activist, member of Poznań Society of Friends of Learning
Teofil Oroian (born 1947), Romanian Army officer and military historian
Teofil Pożyczka (1912–1974), Polish pilot during World War II
Teofil Simchowicz (1879–1957), Polish neurologist who was born in Ciechanowiec, Poland

Polish masculine given names
Romanian masculine given names